After Daybreak: The Liberation of Belsen, 1945, is a book authored by Ben Shephard, published in 2005 by Jonathan Cape and Random House, in which he details the liberation of Belsen by British troops in April 1945.

References 

2005 books
21st-century history books
History books about World War II